The River Fowey is a river in Cornwall, England, United Kingdom.

The estuary is called Uzell (meaning howling place). It is only navigable by larger craft for the last . There is a ferry between Fowey and Bodinnick. The first road crossing going upstream is in Lostwithiel. The river has seven tributaries, the largest being the River Lerryn. The section of the Fowey Valley between Doublebois and Bodmin Parkway railway station is known as the Glynn Valley (meaning deep wooded valley). The valley is the route of both the A38 trunk road and the railway line (built by the Cornwall Railway in 1859). The railway line is carried on eight stone viaducts along this stretch.

History

Donyarth, or Dungarth (died 875), was the last-recorded king of Cornwall. He is thought to be the 'Doniert' recorded on an inscription on King Doniert's Stone, a ninth-century cross shaft which stands in St Cleer parish in Cornwall, although he is not given any title in the inscription.
His death may have been an accident, but it was recorded in Ireland as a punishment for collaboration with the Vikings, who were harrying the West Saxons and briefly occupied Exeter in 876 before being driven out by Alfred the Great. Philip Payton states that one must imagine that he drowned in the River Fowey, near King Doniert's Stone.

The Polbrock Canal, approved by Parliament in the 1790s but never built, would have provided a link between the north and south coasts of Cornwall by joining the River Camel with the Fowey at Bodmin.

Geology and hydrology
The upper reaches of the Fowey are mainly moorland giving way to woodland and farmland, predominantly livestock. This means that 63.6% of the catchment is grassland, with a further 18.3% woodland and 10.7% arable land. Of the remaining 7.5%, 2.6% is urban or built-up areas, 2.5% is mountain, heath and bog and the remainder is inland waters.

The catchment area of the River Fowey covers a total of  consisting of granite (in part kaolinised) on Bodmin Moor, Devonian slates and grits, and peat and valley gravels.

Wildlife and conservation

The river runs through two Sites of Special Scientific Interest (SSSI), one of which is also part of a national nature reserve (NNR). The Upper Fowey SSSI is a floodplain on the southern slopes of Bodmin Moor and is designated for its wet heath vegetation and herbaceous valley-floor mire communities. Downstream at Golitha Falls, part of the woodland is designated a NNR and is within the Draynes Wood SSSI. At this point the river runs through a gorge and is of particular importance for ″lower plants″ such as liverworts, mosses and lichens. Golitha (pronounced Goleetha) is derived from the Cornish word for obstruction. There is a  riverside walk, from the visitor car park. Golitha Falls is the site of Wheal Victoria copper mine.

Recreation 
The upper part of the Fowey valley is within the Bodmin Moor area of the Cornwall Area of Outstanding Natural Beauty so many hikers, holidaymakers and tourists visit the places of interest. The river has very pleasant sites and special paths made for hiking and walking along the banks and in the countryside surrounding the towns; most of Bodmin Moor is designated as 'open access' under the Countryside and Rights of Way Act 2000.

The River Fowey is famous for its sailing because of its natural harbour. In the past it has been visited by up to 7,000 yachts in one season. Almost all sections of the river have been paddled by kayakers and canoeists: from the whitewater sections high up on the moor, all the way down to the estuary. Fowey has an excellent local chandlery.

Many fish can be caught in the River Fowey so many fishermen come to enjoy the excellent fishing conditions.

Ferry services 
Fowey to Polruan passenger and cycle ferry – runs year round.

Fowey to Bodinnick Ferry – there has been a ferry crossing the narrows between Fowey and Bodinnick since at least the 14th century. Today there is a vehicle ferry that runs year round between Bodinnick slipway and Caffa Mill slipway in Fowey.

The Fowey to Mevagissey Passenger Ferry – a timetabled summer service leaving Whitehouse Slip. Journey time is around 40 minutes. It provides an alternative route to the Lost Gardens of Heligan, finishing the journey on foot or by taxi.

References

External links

 Golitha Falls

Rivers of Cornwall
National nature reserves in Cornwall
Sites of Special Scientific Interest in Cornwall
Cornish Killas